Thomas Henry Davies  (30 October 1881 – 11 September 1942) was an Australian politician.

He was born in Beaconsfield. A decorated World War I veteran, he was first elected to the Tasmanian House of Assembly in 1929 as a Labor member for Bass in a recount following Allan Guy's move to federal politics. He served as a minister from 1934 until his death in 1942 in George Town.

References

1881 births
1942 deaths
Members of the Tasmanian House of Assembly
Companions of the Distinguished Service Order
Recipients of the Military Cross
Australian Labor Party members of the Parliament of Tasmania
20th-century Australian politicians
Australian military personnel of World War I